Adelaide Victoria Kane (born 9 August 1990) is an Australian actress and model. She first gained recognition for her roles as Lolly Allen in the soap opera Neighbours and Tenaya 7 (later Tenaya 15) in the children's series Power Rangers RPM. She went on to star as Mary, Queen of Scots in the American CW period drama Reign. She also appeared as Cora Hale in the third season of the MTV series Teen Wolf and Drizella in the ABC series Once Upon a Time.

Early life
Adelaide Victoria Kane was born on 9 August 1990 in Claremont, a suburb of Perth, Western Australia. Her Scottish father was originally from Glasgow, while her mother is an Australian of Scottish, Irish and French descent.

Her parents divorced when she was seven, and Adelaide and her brother were raised by their single mother. She grew up in Perth, and attended St Hilda's Anglican School for Girls.
When she joined the cast of Neighbours, she and her mother moved to Melbourne, while her brother and stepfather remained in Perth. She also lived for a short period in New Zealand, while shooting children's television series Power Rangers RPM.

In September 2009, at the age of 19, she moved to the United States to live in Los Angeles in order to pursue her acting career.

Career
Kane began performing at the age of three, starting with dance and then moving to singing and acting. At the age of six, she started working professionally in some print ads, later moving to TV spots and working in various children's TV shows.

In August 2006, Kane was picked to join the cast of Neighbours as Lolly Allen after she entered a competition run by Dolly magazine. She was given a three-month contract with the show. Her friends convinced her to enter the competition, but she did not think she was actually going to get the role. In December 2006, Kane announced that she would be leaving the show after her contract was not renewed. At the time of the announcement, Kane had not yet appeared as Lolly. In 2008, Kane was nominated for a Logie Award for Most Popular New Female Talent for her performance as Lolly.

From March to December 2009, Kane portrayed Tenaya 7 on Power Rangers RPM, part of the long-running Power Rangers franchise.

In April 2010, Kane starred in the television film Secrets of the Mountain on NBC. In 2010, she also starred in the Hulu series Pretty Tough, composed of 20 episodes and based on the novel by the same name written by Li Tigelaar. In 2010, Kane traveled to attend an audition for Cartoon Network's first live-action series Unnatural History, for the role of Maggie Winnock.  She and Italia Ricci were the actresses selected for the casting; the role later went to Ricci.

In 2012, she portrayed Aubrey in the film Goats. On 28 November 2012 it was announced that Kane had joined the cast of Teen Wolf as Cora Hale.

In February 2013, Kane was cast as Mary, Queen of Scots in the CW period drama series Reign. The same year, she appeared in the successful thriller film The Purge.

Kane also appears in World of Warcraft: Warlords of Draenor as a human death knight.

In 2014, Kane appeared in the horror film The Devil's Hand as Ruth. She originally auditioned for Alycia Debnam-Carey's role, but producers thought she was not right for the part, so they offered her Ruth, who got more along with her personality. 
Kane starred in Scott Speer's short thriller film Realm in 2015,

In June 2016, Kane joined the cast of Dragons: Race to the Edge as the voice of Mala, Queen of the Defenders of the Wing.

In July 2017, Kane joined the hit ABC series Once Upon A Time in a recurring role for its reboot season seven. Kane was one of five actresses to join the series for its new season in starring and recurring roles, following the exits of six key cast members at the end of season six. She played one of the antagonists, Drizella, one of Cinderella's wicked stepsisters. Kane's final episode in Once Upon a Time was "Sisterhood".

In September 2019, Kane was announced as one of the cast members of Into the Darks second Halloween installment, Uncanny Annie, which premiered on Hulu the following month. She did some coaching sessions to prepare and soften up for the role. Before she was cast for Uncanny Annie, Kane was supposed to appear in Into the Dark's first installment The Body, but the character director Paul Davis wanted her for was cut right before the shooting draft was locked. 
In October 2019, Kane joined the cast of CBS's SEAL Team for its third season.

In March 2020, Kane joined the main cast of the sci-fi action film Cosmic Sin. The same month, Kane made a cameo in NBC's This Is Us''' season four finale as Hailey Damon, Toby Damon and Kate Pearson's adopted, daughter.

In the Fall of 2022 Adelaide joined the cast of Grey’s Anatomy in season 19 as a new intern.

Personal life
Kane was in a relationship with Reign co-star Sean Teale between 2014 and 2016. In July 2019, Kane started a relationship with her Into the Dark'' co-star Jacques Colimon. The couple split sometime in 2020. In February 2021, Kane revealed she is bisexual. In April 2021, Kane started dating Dutch model Marthe Woertman.

Kane suffers from generalised anxiety disorder, and has spoken up multiple times about the importance to break the stigma surrounding mental illness.

Filmography

Film

Television

Theatre

Awards and nominations

References

External links

 

1990 births
21st-century Australian actresses
Actresses from Perth, Western Australia
Australian child actresses
Australian expatriate actresses in the United States
Australian film actresses
Australian people of French descent
Australian people of Irish descent
Australian people of Scottish descent
Australian soap opera actresses
Living people
Australian LGBT actors
People educated at St Hilda's Anglican School for Girls
Bisexual actresses
LGBT models
21st-century LGBT people